Mista Savona (born Jake Dominic Savona) is a highly regarded reggae, dancehall and hip-hop producer and keyboardist based in Melbourne, Australia.

He first gained international recognition with the release of his self-produced album Melbourne Meets Kingston, released by Elefant Traks in 2007. This 21-track album was recorded in Jamaica and Australia, and is the first ever album length collaboration between Australian and Jamaican musicians. It features performances from Jamaican singers and deejays such as Anthony B, Determine and Big Youth. It was followed in 2011 with the international release of his follow up studio album Warn the Nation, recorded in the UK, Jamaica, Australia and Africa. It features internationally renowned artists such as Capleton, Sizzla, Horace Andy (Massive Attack), Alton Ellis (in one of his last recordings), Burro Banton and more. The album received widespread critical acclaim, including Triple J describing it as “Australia’s definitive reggae album”.

He is also the first Australian producer to release his own riddim series in Jamaica, the successful 'Fire Dragon' riddim released in 2009 which features artists such as Sizzla, Burro Banton and Vida-Sunshyne. Other releases include two solo albums, Invasion Day and Bass & Roots, as well as Born a King, a full-length album with Jamaican singer Sizzla which is being hailed as one of the strongest of Sizzla's career. The single I'm Living, taken from this album, has been remixed by producer Gaudi.

In 2017 Savona released his seminal album Havana Meets Kingston, a world-first collaboration between the musicians of Cuba and Jamaica. Recorded at the legendary EGREM Studios in Havana, Cuba (where the now famous Buena Vista Social Club album was recorded in 1996), the album was released to universal claim. Musicians featured on the album include Jamaican rhythm section Sly and Robbie, famed guitarist Ernest Ranglin and original members of Buena Vista Social Club, Los Van Van and Irakere. International tours followed including a live performance at the Royal Albert Hall in London for the BBC Proms, televised in full on BBC TV & Radio, with Clive Davis from The Times saying that El Cuarto de Tula and 410 Sam Miguel were nothing short of explosive”.

Discography

Albums

Awards and nominations

ARIA Music Awards
The ARIA Music Awards is an annual awards ceremony that recognises excellence, innovation, and achievement across all genres of Australian music. They commenced in 1987.

! 
|-
| 2019
| Havana Meets Kingston
| ARIA Award for Best World Music Album
| 
| 
|-
| 2022
| Havana Meets Kingston Part 2
| ARIA Award for Best World Music Album
| 
|

References

Australian reggae musicians
Australian hip hop musicians
Living people
Obese Records artists
Year of birth missing (living people)